William Morris Barker (May 12, 1854 – February 21, 1901) was bishop of the Episcopal Diocese of Olympia from 1894 to 1901. He also served as bishop of the former Episcopal Diocese of Western Colorado from 1893 to 1894.

Episcopacy 
William Morris Barker was consecrated on January 25, 1893, to the Missionary Diocese of Western Colorado.  In 1894 he became the fourth Missionary Bishop of Olympia and then became the first bishop of the Diocese of Olympia.

He died February 21, 1901

References 

 Thomas E. Jessett, "The Episcopate of William Morris Barker Second Missionary Bishop of Olympia (1894-1901)" in Historical Magazine of the Protestant Episcopal Church, Vol. 39, No. 3 (September 1970), pp. 251–263.

External links 

Photograph
Archives

1854 births
1901 deaths
19th-century American Episcopalians
Episcopal bishops of Olympia
Episcopal bishops of Western Colorado
19th-century American clergy